The Northfield News is a weekly newspaper available in Northfield, Williamstown and Roxbury, Vermont, as well as some other local towns. The Northfield News has been continually published since 1878.  

The paper is owned by Northfield News Publishing, LLC.  The publisher and editor is John Cruickshank. 

The paper employees two full-time employees, has several part-time employees and several freelance writers.  The paper covers local entertainment, sports, news, and police reports.  It also has a local classifieds section and advertisements for businesses in the Northfield and Williamstown area.  The paper is sold at many businesses in the area and can also be subscribed to via standard mail. The newspaper also maintains a website www.thenorthfieldnews.com and is very active on Facebook and posts on Twitter. The newspaper is published each week on Wednesday and received in local households on Thursdays.  The website is updated each Thursday evening where the entire newspaper can be read online.

It is one of the few media outlets for the Northfield area.

Newspapers published in Vermont
1878 establishments in Vermont
Publications established in 1878